Saint Paul, Minnesota is the capital of Minnesota. The city is also the largest city and county seat of Ramsey County.  Saint Paul has a strong mayor-council government. Seven city council members elected in wards and one mayor elected at large serve the city.

City government and politics

Saint Paul is governed with a variation of the strong mayor-council form of government. The mayor is the chief executive and chief administrative officer for the city and the seven member city council is the legislative body. The mayor is elected from the entire city, while members of the city council are elected from seven different geographic wards, which have approximately equal populations. Both the mayor and the city council serve four-year terms.

The mayor's duties include preparing an annual budget, appointing heads to executive departments of the city and either signing or vetoing legislative ordinance passed by the city council. The city council is responsible for the city budget, which is supposed to be based on the mayor's proposed budget. All appointments made by the mayor must be approved by the city council. The city council may override the mayor's veto. In addition, the city council creates all of the city's ordinance. The city council may create legislative ordinance with four of seven votes. Legislative ordinance  must then be presented to the mayor who may then veto or approve the legislation. With an additional vote, for a total of five votes, the council may override the mayor's veto.

In addition to the mayor-council system, Saint Paul is governed by a unique neighborhood system. Since 1975, the city is split up into 17  City Districts, which are then governed by a District Council.  The District Councils receive funding from the city but are otherwise independently run. Most councils have significant power on land use issues.

Mayor

The city has had three mayors who were natives of Ireland, William Dawson, Christopher D. O'Brien, and Frank Doran. Other Irish-American mayors of Saint Paul include: William Mahoney, William H. Fallon, John J. McDonough, Edward K. Delaney, John C. Daubney, Joseph E. Dillon, Thomas R. Byrne, Randy Kelly, and the current mayor, Chris Coleman. Unlike the rest of Minnesota and Minneapolis, Saint Paul has always been a Democratic stronghold. Aside from Norm Coleman who became a Republican in his second term, Saint Paul has not elected a Republican mayor since 1952. The city's current mayor is Melvin Carter, a member of the Democratic-Farmer-Labor Party (DFL).

City Council

As of the 2019 general election the Saint Paul City Council included:

State

Saint Paul is the capital of the state of Minnesota.  The city hosts the capitol building, designed by Saint Paul resident Cass Gilbert. The Minnesota Supreme Court meets in the state capitol as well as the Minnesota Judicial Center. The Minnesota house and senate office buildings are also in the city. The Minnesota Governor's Residence, which is used for some state functions, is on Summit Avenue.

The Minnesota Democratic-Farmer-Labor Party, the state affiliate of the Democratic Party, is headquartered in Saint Paul.

Saint Paul is also the county seat for Ramsey County.

The city is represented by four Minnesota Senate districts; 64, 65, 66 and 67. Minnesota House of Representatives districts 64A, 64B, 65A, 65B, 66A, 66B, 67A and 67B are all located in the city.

*District also includes Falcon Heights, Lauderdale and Roseville .

Federal
Saint Paul is located in Minnesota's 4th congressional district, a solidly Democratic district with a CPVI of D + 13. The district is represented by Betty McCollum, a progressive Democrat, scoring 92% progressive by a progressive group and 4% conservative by a conservative group on a range of issues.  Former U.S. Senator, Norm Coleman, was formerly mayor of Saint Paul. Saint Paul's Xcel Energy Center was the host of the 2008 Republican National Convention.

References

Government of Saint Paul, Minnesota
Saint Paul